Roman Poltoratsky (born 22 July 1972) is a Uzbekistani athlete. He competed in the men's discus throw at the 1996 Summer Olympics and the 2000 Summer Olympics.

In 1995, at the Championship of Uzbekistan in athletics, he threw a discus at 61 meters and won first place. At the Asian Athletics Championships in Jakarta (Indonesia), he won a silver medal in the discus throw with a score of 57.36 meters.

References

1972 births
Living people
Athletes (track and field) at the 1996 Summer Olympics
Athletes (track and field) at the 2000 Summer Olympics
Uzbekistani male discus throwers
Olympic athletes of Uzbekistan
Place of birth missing (living people)
20th-century Uzbekistani people